Khosla Ka Ghosla is a 2006 Indian Hindi-language comedy drama film directed by Dibakar Banerjee, in his directorial debut. It was produced by Savita Raj Hiremath under the Taandav Films label and Ronnie Screwvala from UTV Motion Pictures. Written by Jaideep Sahni, the film stars Anupam Kher, Boman Irani, Parvin Dabas, Vinay Pathak, Ranvir Shorey and Tara Sharma in the lead roles. The story follows Kamal Kishore Khosla (Kher), a middle-class Delhiite and his family's attempt to reclaim their land which has been seized by a builder, Khurana (Irani).

Banerjee, an advertising filmmaker, wanted to make a feature film which showcased Delhi the way it is. The initial idea conceived by Hiremath and Sahni was about a generation gap. After finishing the script, Sahni informed Banerjee that he had found a producer in Delhi and asked him if he wanted to direct the film; Banerjee agreed to do so. The film had no buyers for two years during which time editing continued. The team showed the film to several people who loved it but were unwilling to back it. In 2006, UTV Motion Pictures stepped in and distributed the film.

Khosla Ka Ghosla was screened at the 2006 Kara Film Festival and was released on 22 September 2006 to positive critical reception. It won the National Film Award for Best Feature Film in Hindi at the 54th National Film Awards. Made on a production budget of ₹37.5 million, the film earned a total of ₹66.7 million at the box-office, making it a commercial success. It was later remade in 2008 in Tamil as Poi Solla Porom and in Kannada as Rame Gowda Vs. Krishna Reddy in 2010.

Plot Summary 

Kamal Kishore Khosla (Anupam Kher) is a normal middle-class man living in New Delhi where he has purchased a plot of land to build a new house for his family. His family includes his wife Sudha Khosla (Kiran Juneja), the younger son, Chiraunji Lal a.k.a. Cherry (Parvin Dabas), elder son Balwant a.k.a. Bunty (Ranvir Shorey) and his tomboy daughter, Nikki (Rupam Bajwa). Kamal Khosla has invested all his hard-earned savings from provident fund into buying a plot in South Delhi. Cherry is not too interested in his father's plan; while his father’s intention to buy that land is because it is near to Cherry’s own office. He is a software engineer and intends to move to the United States to take up a job there. However, Cherry has not let his family in on his plans. While applying for a visa to move in the US, the visa agent, Asif Iqbal (Vinay Pathak) mocks on Cherry’s name, Chiraunji Lal, which he feels ashamed of and decides to change his name. He then tells his family about his decision to change his name; his father taunts him for so. Kamal, after realising that times have changed and somewhat agrees with Cherry’s decision. Due to the fight, Cherry wasn’t talking with his father. To spend some time with Cherry, his friend and colleague, Mr. Amar Sahni (Vinod Nagpal), suggests Mr. Khosla to have some drinks with his younger son so they spend some time together again. After coming late to their home, Bunty and Kamal offer him a drink for their celebrating their buy; the plot in South Delhi. Cherry reveals that he doesn’t drink, due to which his Mr. Khosla is angry by his decision; ensues a verbal fight. His father tells that to stay in this house he has to do the things necessary and participate in the family; Cherry reveals that he has applied for a job in the United States and will soon be moving there after a formal interview with the company is completed. Cherry’s easy-going girlfriend, Meghna (Tara Sharma), who is an actor, was surprised by such his decision he indirectly revealed to her prior to the fight between him and his father and feels that he should stay and support his family. As a result of Cherry’s decision, she is angry at him.

During a visit to their land for Bhumipujan, they find their plot encroached upon by some other party. Bunty interrogates the watchman; further probing reveals the squatters are part of a property usurping nexus headed by the corrupt and powerful local tycoon and land shark Kishen Khurrana (Boman Irani). Upon being urged so by the property dealer, Vijendar (Rajendra Sethi) who had facilitated the purchase of the plot, Vijendar tells Mr. Khosla to bid on their plot, demanding approximately the half of the Khoslas’ plot: ₹15 lakh. Vijendar later suggests them go to Khurrana’s farmhouse to make the deal with Khurrana himself. Mr. Khosla doesn’t deny nor he accepts the deal proposed by Khurrana; but rather thinks it is lawfully unethical. He appeals to local government authorities, political agencies, campaigners for help. None of them offers more than to get the amount Khurrana demands reduced by a few lakhs in exchange for a hefty commission for mediating the deal. He feels dejected due to such unexpected twists and such corrupted bodies.

Spurred by his father's helplessness, Bunty gets help from a gang of local wrestlers who demolish the boundary walls built by Khurana's men and take back possession of the plot by force. This success is short-lived when Mr. Khosla is arrested on trumped-up charges of trespass. Released at Khurrana's guileful behest after spending a day in jail, Kamal's will is broken and his pride battered. He tells his family to avoid taking any further action as he is incapable of fighting back and wants Cherry to concentrate on the job that he is arranging abroad. Meghna cheers up Cherry to support his family and then he visits Asif, who claimed in his meeting with Cherry that if the party is Khurrana, then he can surely help them. Cherry and Meghna go to discuss the grim situation with Iqbal who is revealed to have been an old partner of Khurrana’s and who has been cheated by him, having usurped Asif's own ancestral land. As a revenge and in order to teach Khurrana a lesson, Asif offers to help the Khoslas with a group of Meghna's friends, and they set up a plan to deceive Khurrana and take money from him. They plan out an idea by Asif, where they have to portray a large piece of land (owned by the Fisheries Department, but which has been vacant for decades) as their own, and seek the help of Meghna's mentor, Bapu, to act as the owner of the land looking for a buyer. Bapu (Navin Nischol), who is the manager of a drama theatre group, poses as M.L. Sethi: a Dubai-based businessman and the owner of the vacant land. With the help of the rest of his theatre group, they manage to create an ideal situation so that Khurrana believes the authenticity of the land and its owner. 

The deal is almost finalised, while Vijendar asks for 3% of the plot deal of Khurrana and with M.L. Sethi, as he had told Khurrana about it. Surprisingly, he is silently kicked-off the deal. Khurrana asks to visit the land where Asif and Khoslas have planned out everything by keeping Bapu’s own actors to pose as workers and labourers at the land. The deal is almost done but when Bapu sees ₹35 lakh advance cash with a deal of ₹1.25 crore; he gets anxious and leaves the place. Khurrana thinks that he has offered less to a party from abroad; and later calls his assistant Mani (Nitesh Pandey), stating that he offered a low price and agrees of offer ₹1.4 crore. But in order for the deal to go through, Khurrana says that he would like to visit the land again. But due to Bapu’s actors gone out-of-station for their acting performance; the Khoslas themselves pose as workers and labourers at the land. After the visit, Khurrana takes M.L. Sethi and his assistant Mani to have some drinks at his farmhouse. Khurrana’s assistant, Munjal (Rajesh Sharma) gets a tip that the Sethi Associates are not legit and are not a real party, but because Khurrana refers his staff (including assistant) as low-born people, Munjal quietly leaves with a frown. Bapu and his assistant successfully dupe Khurana and take cash worth ₹35 lakh from his farmhouse, giving it to Cherry and Asif — leaving both of them exhilarated. Khurrana — now wasted due to drinks, declines to hear anything from Munjal. From that money, Mr. Khosla pays the ransom to Khurrana and regains possession of his plot and Khurrana evacuates the Khoslas’ plot. The remaining cash obtained by duping Khurrana is later divided equally between the Khoslas, Asif and Bapu’s Theatre Group. Cherry changes his name to Chirag and scraps his plans to move to the US saying that the company wasn’t him paying much, soon marries Meghna and settles with his family in their new house built on the plot. With the construction of the New Khosla Kunj, Bunty opens up his own business, becoming a real estate agent. In the ending credits, it is seen that Khurrana acknowledges that he has been cheated and duped and decides to cover the sham deal with Sethi Associates )Bapu) up to preserve his reputation.

Cast 
Anupam Kher as Kamal Kishore Khosla
Boman Irani as Kishen Khurana
Parvin Dabas as Chiraunji Lal "Cherry" Khosla
Vinay Pathak as Asif Iqbal
Ranvir Shorey as Balwant "Bunty" Khosla
Tara Sharma as Meghna Chopra
Kiran Juneja as Sudha Khosla
Rajendra Sethi as Vijendar
Rupam Bajwa as Nikki Khosla
Vinod Nagpal as Mr Amar Sawhney
Navin Nischol as Bapu / Mr. Rohit Sethi
Nitesh Pandey as Mani
Anusha Lall as Katori
V K Sharma as Insan Singh
Rajesh Sharma as Munjal
Danish Aslam as Inspector

Production 
Dibakar Banerjee, who was making advertisement films in Delhi, wished to make a feature film "which portrayed Delhi as it is". The initial idea of the generation gap was conceived by Savita Raj Hiremath and her writer friend Jaideep Sahni, who had worked with Banerjee on advertising films. Sahni said the soul of Khosla Ka Ghosla was derived from their experience of growing up in a middle-class house in Delhi. The first half of the film was based on Sahni's personal experience of an incident in his family which left an impression on him. He thought about "how our entire system can so callously and efficiently come together in no time to exploit a common man in trouble." Later Sahni informed Banerjee that he had found a producer from Delhi and asked him if he wanted to direct the film; Banerjee agreed to do so. Banerjee said a real life experience when Sahni witnessed his father being insulted by someone powerful, helped them to develop the character of the antagonist Khurana. Sahni worked on the story for a year-and-a-half and finished in 2003. Both Banerjee and Sahni first approached Anupam Kher to play Kamal Kishore Khosla; he was "hooked" after their discussions.

Vinay Pathak had auditioned for Khurana's character for which Boman Irani was eventually selected, but the team liked Pathak's audition and offered him the role of Asif Iqbal. Ranvir Shorey was selected for the role of Balwant after two or three rounds of auditions. The role of Khurana was also offered to Rishi Kapoor who refused it. Hiremath felt this was because "commercially, it (the role) wasn't working for him." Irani had also initially refused the offer to play Khurana as he felt he was unsuitable for the role of a builder from Delhi since he was a Mumbai-born Parsi. He accepted the role after "a lot of people had raised their eyebrows" at his decision and he felt determined to make it work. Irani drove around and listened to interviews recorded with actual property dealers. He also watched real footage captured using hidden cameras to understand how they behaved. Kher said that he tried to boost the team's morale as the film was made while enduring a lot of stress. Tara Sharma was selected for the role of Meghna after an audition. Banerjee was initially reluctant to give Parvin Dabas the role of Chiraunjilal as he thought the latter would not be able to do justice to the "layered character." Dabas but later cast in the role after a recommendation and an audition. Navin Nischol was cast as Bapu.

During the course of filming, Banerjee kept Irani separate from the rest of the cast as he did not want them to meet. During filming, the investors demanded the addition of action sequences, an item song and changes in the cast. The team did not fancy these changes so Padmalaya Telefilms, their first investor, backed out of the project. Hiremath said that she had to "shell out cash" from her other company. The film's small budget meant there were limited reels to shoot. After the filming finished, the team had no money for post-production. The entire film was shot in 45 days in Delhi during the summer.

The entire opening dream sequence was filmed in one take using a hand-held camera to give it a "separate look from the rest of the film". Amitabha Singh served as the director of photography, while Sejal Painter was the editor. Banerjee had a different, sad ending for the film, but opted for Sahni's version of a more optimistic ending after realising his idea would make the film darker. The film did not have any buyers for two years. During this period editing continued. The team showed the film to several people who loved it but were unwilling to back it. Banerjee said that he gave up on releasing the film after several rejections. Later, in 2006, UTV Motion Pictures stepped in and distributed the film.

Soundtrack 
The soundtrack album of Khosla Ka Ghosla was composed by Dhruv Dhalla and Bapi–Tutul while the lyrics were written by Jaideep Sahni. It consists of five songs with vocals by Kailash Kher, Kunal Ganjawala, Sowmya Raoh, Adnan Sami and Qadar Niazi Qawwal. Savita, the film's producer, managed to raise some funds for the music and Sahni wrote the lyrics the same day as he was worried they might miss the opportunity. This was Dhalla's debut film. Banerjee called him after hearing his music samples and asked him to create "a Punjabi number based on the loud attitude of Delhi." Dhalla composed the tune for "Chak De Phattey" in three hours.

The album received moderate reviews. Joginder Tuteja of IndiaFM called it an "average soundtrack with two songs standing out." Further writing: "While 'Chak De Phattey' is a potential chartbuster, 'Intezar Aitbaar Tumse Pyaar' makes for an easy-on-ears listening."

Release and reception 
Khosla Ka Ghosla was screened at the 2006 Kara Film Festival and the Hay Festival in 2012. It was released theatrically on 22 September 2006 on 125 screens throughout the country. The film was released on the DVD format on 6 November 2006 and is also available on the online streaming platform, Netflix.

Critical response 
Khosla Ka Ghosla opened to widespread critical acclaim upon release. Rajeev Masand lauded the film for its "refreshingly original plot, bang-on casting, killer soundtrack and such crisp editing that there is never a dull moment". A review in The Times of India called it "a small, unpretentious venture with some real funny performances". Raja Sen described the film as the "best comedy Bollywood has seen in the last two decades", adding: "The everyday detailing is exquisite, as is the ensemble cast dealing with a frighteningly realistic first half escaping into a breezily unreal second half. It’s sheer magic."

Kaveree Bamzai of India Today declared the film as "a class apart.": "It brings back an innocence to movies missing in the sturm und drang of big budgets and bigger stars."
Sukanya Verma of Rediff.com felt the film was charming for its "striking believability and everyday simplicity." However, she noted that it "felt longer than it was." Namrata Joshi described the film as "utterly discreet and unassuming", one that "tries to bring back the clean and simple story-telling of Sai Paranjpye and Hrishikesh Mukherjee." Taran Adarsh noted that the film "loses sparkle in the second hour". He also concluded that on the whole "Khosla Ka Ghosla is a well scripted and executed film that is sure to stand out in the crowd."

Sudhish Kamath of The Hindu included the film on his list of top 10 movies of the decade 2000–2009 saying: "Dibakar Banerjee and Sahni on a shoestring budget chose to bat for the common man’s struggle against the powerful and reunited the individual self back with the family." David Parkinson of Radio Times wrote: "Switching between bright comedy and social drama, this is Bollywood entertainment with a conscience." In September 2018, Bhaskar Chawla of Arre noted that the film had "set the template for what was to become a new direction in Hindi cinema" that went "beyond the conventional formula of Bollywood."

Box office 

Awards 
Khosla Ka Ghosla won the National Film Award for Best Feature Film in Hindi at the 54th National Film Awards. In October 2015, Banerjee decided to return the award to the government along with 12 other filmmakers, to protest the Ministry of Information and Broadcasting's refusal to roll back Film and Television Institute of India's appointment of Gajendra Chauhan as its chairman. The film's producer, Savita Raj Hiremath, claimed that Banerjee had no right to return the award since it was given to the film and not him.

Post-release 
Khosla Ka Ghosla is considered by many critics as one of the best films by Banerjee. It was included in Filmfares 100 Days series—"With no big stars, relatively unheard of a director and a subject that you wouldn't rate on paper as the most exciting, Khosla Ka Ghosla manages to impress one and all." It was also mentioned in critic and author Shubhra Gupta's book, 50 Films That Changed Bollywood, 1995–2015.

In 2013, The Delhi Police Crime Branch caught a gang of cheats who duped several people by selling them plots belonging to the Delhi Development Authority by using forged documents. The officials said that the method adopted by the gang appeared to have been inspired by the film. The film was remade in Tamil as Poi Solla Porom. Directed by A. L. Vijay, the film starred Karthik Kumar, Piaa Bajpai, and Nedumudi Venu in the lead roles. It was released on 12 September 2008. It was unofficially remade in Kannada by T. N. Nagesh as Rame Gowda Vs. Krishna Reddy in 2010.

References

Further reading

External links 
 
 Website 

2006 films
2000s Hindi-language films
Films set in Delhi
2006 comedy-drama films
Films directed by Dibakar Banerjee
Indian comedy-drama films
Hindi films remade in other languages
UTV Motion Pictures films
Best Hindi Feature Film National Film Award winners
2006 directorial debut films
2006 comedy films
2006 drama films